Megarine is a town and commune in Touggourt Province, Algeria, located just north of the city of Touggourt. According to the 2008 census it has a population of 13,751, up from 10,996 in 1998, and an annual growth rate of 2.3%.

Geography

Megarine lies in a large area of palm plantations on an oasis network that extends from Sidi Slimane past Touggourt through to Balidat Ameur. Beyond the oases is the arid and barren landscape of the Sahara, featuring areas of sand dunes (ergs) and flat rocky plains (regs).

Climate

Megarine has a hot desert climate (Köppen climate classification BWh), with very hot summers and mild winters. Rainfall is light and sporadic, and summers are particularly dry.

Transportation

From the intersection, the town is connected to Biskra to the north, and Touggourt  to the south.

The train line from Biskra to Touggourt also runs near the town at the junction of the local road with the N3. While there is no station here, there is a station in Touggourt.

Education

6.4% of the population has a tertiary education, and another 16.9% has completed secondary education. The overall literacy rate is 80.6%, and is 87.5% among males and 74.1% among females.

Localities
The commune is composed of five localities:

Meggarine Djedida
Meggarine Guedima
Amiche
El Ksour
Ghamra

References

Neighbouring towns and cities

Communes of Ouargla Province
Algeria
Cities in Algeria